New Brunswick is one of the thirteen provinces and territories of Canada. It is one of the three Maritime provinces and one of the four Atlantic provinces. It is the only province with both English and French as its official languages.

New Brunswick is bordered by Quebec to the north, Nova Scotia to the east, the Gulf of Saint Lawrence to the northeast, the Bay of Fundy to the southeast, and the U.S. state of Maine to the west. New Brunswick is about 83% forested and its northern half is occupied by the Appalachians. The province's climate is continental with snowy winters and temperate summers.

Atypically for Canada, only about half of the population lives in urban areas. New Brunswick's largest cities are Moncton and Saint John, while its capital is Fredericton.

In 1969, New Brunswick passed the Official Languages Act which began recognizing French as an official language, along with English. New Brunswickers have the right to receive provincial government services in the official language of their choice. New Brunswick is home to most of the cultural region of Acadia and most Acadians. New Brunswick's variety of French is called Acadian French and 7 regional accents can be found.

New Brunswick was first inhabited by First Nations like the Miꞌkmaq and Maliseet. In 1604, Acadia, the first New France colony, was founded with the creation of Port-Royal. For 150 years afterwards, Acadia changed hands a few times due to numerous conflicts between France and the United Kingdom. From 1755 to 1764, the British deported Acadians en masse, an event known as the Great Upheaval. This, along with the Treaty of Paris, solidified Acadia as British property. In 1784, following the arrival of many loyalists fleeing the American Revolution, the colony of New Brunswick was officially created, separating it from what is now Nova Scotia. In the early 1800s, New Brunswick prospered and the population grew rapidly. In 1867, New Brunswick decided to confederate with Nova Scotia and the Province of Canada (now Quebec and Ontario) to form Canada. After Confederation, shipbuilding and lumbering declined, and protectionism disrupted trade with New England.

From the mid-1900s onwards, New Brunswick was one of the poorest regions of Canada, a fact eventually mitigated by transfer payments. However, the province has seen the highest eastward migration in 45 years in both rural and urban areas, as people living in Ontario and other parts of Canada migrate to the area. As of 2002, the provincial GDP was derived as follows: services (about half being government services and public administration) 43%; construction, manufacturing, and utilities 24%; real estate rental 12%; wholesale and retail 11%; agriculture, forestry, fishing, hunting, mining, oil and gas extraction 5%; transportation and warehousing 5%. A powerful corporate concentration of large companies in New Brunswick are owned by the Irving Group of Companies. The province's 2019 output was CA$38.236 billion, which is 1.65% of Canada's GDP.

Tourism accounts for 9% of the labour force either directly or indirectly. Popular destinations include the Hopewell Rocks, Fundy National Park, Magnetic Hill, Kouchibouguac National Park and Roosevelt Campobello International Park.

Toponymy
New Brunswick was named in 1784 in honour of George III, King of Great Britain, King of Ireland, and prince-elector of Brunswick-Lüneburg in what is now Germany.

History

Indigenous societies and European explorations (pre-1604)

Paleo-Indians are believed to have been the first humans on the land of New Brunswick, settling there roughly 10,000 years ago. Because their descendants did not leave a written record, there is a lack of knowledge of the history of the area before the arrival of European explorers. At the time of European contact, inhabitants were the Micmac of New Brunswick's eastern coast, the Maliseet of the Wolastoq valley, and the Passamaquoddy of the St. Croix River valley. These people all lived a hunter-gatherer lifestyle. Many tribal placenames originate from their Eastern Algonquian languages, such as Aroostook, Bouctouche, Memramcook, Petitcodiac, Quispamsis, Richibucto and Shediac.

The first documented European exploration of New Brunswick was made by Jacques Cartier in 1534, when his party set foot in Miscou and explored the coasts of Chaleur Bay. They made contact with aboriginals, who from this point on began to trade with Europeans. This also exposed them to Old World diseases.

Acadia and Nova Scotia (1604-1784)

Acadia, a colonial division of New France covering the Maritimes, was founded in 1604 by Samuel de Champlain and Pierre Dugua de Mons with a settlement on Saint Croix Island. It was quickly abandoned due to difficult living conditions and moved to Acadia's capital, Port-Royal. There, the Micmacs helped the French survive. In 1626, Port-Royal was destroyed by the British. The British conquered Acadia shortly after and held it until 1629. James VI and I, King of Scotland, renamed it "Nova Scotia" in English.

The Micmacs helped all French survivors, including Charles de Saint-Étienne de la Tour. Together, they established a fur trade network along the Saint John River. With the onset of the Anglo-French War (1627–1629), de la Tour was issued a charter to govern Acadia. In 1629, Acadia was officially returned to France. As such, a new wave of French settlers arrived in Port-Royal to revitalise the colony, including Isaac de Razilly, a new governor of Acadia, and Charles de Menou d'Aulnay, his cousin. de Razilly and de la Tour's charters conflicted with each others', but the two maintained an amicable relationship. In 1635, de Razilly died, triggering tensions between de la Tour, who governed from the Saint John valley, and d'Aulnay, who governed from Port-Royal. In the 1630s, this erupted into the Acadian Civil War. d'Aulnay managed to expel de la Tour in 1644. But, following d'Aulnay's death in 1650, de la Tour married his widow in 1653, essentially overturning his success.

Over time, French settlement extended up the river to the site of present-day Fredericton. Other settlements in the southeast extended from Beaubassin, near the present-day border with Nova Scotia, to Baie Verte, and up the Petitcodiac, Memramcook, and Shepody Rivers. The descendants of Acadia's French colonists became the Acadians. Acadians developed a unique society characterised by dyking technology, which allowed them to cultivate marshes left by the Bay of Fundy's tides, and by tightly knit independent communities, because they were often neglected by French authorities.

During the 1690s, in King William's War, attacks were launched from the Saint John valley by Acadian militias onto New England colonists. This would create a deep English hostility against the French presence in the region.

From the 1600s to mid-1700s, Acadia was routinely a war zone between the French and the English and would often change hands. However, Acadia would definitively fall into British hands following Queen Anne's War, a conquest of most of the Acadian peninsula, formalized by the Treaty of Utrecht of 1713. After the war, Acadia was reduced to Île Saint-Jean (Prince Edward Island) and Île-Royale (Cape Breton Island), with the ownership of continental Acadia (New Brunswick) being disputed between France and Britain, with an informal border on the Isthmus of Chignecto. In an effort to limit British expansion into continental Acadia, the French built Fort Beauséjour at the isthmus in 1751. 

From 1749 to 1755, Father Le Loutre's War took place, where British soldiers fought against Acadians and Micmacs to consolidate their power over Acadia/Nova Scotia. In 1755, the British captured Fort Beauséjour, severing the Acadian supply lines to Nova Scotia, and Île-Royale. Continental Acadia thus came to be incorporated into the British colony of Nova Scotia with the Treaty of Paris in 1763. Following this, the British, unsatisfied with the Acadian's surrender because they refused to pledge allegiance, turned to capturing and exporting Acadians en masse, an ethnic cleansing event known as the Deportation of the Acadians which was ordered by Robert Monckton. From 1755 to 1763, 12,000 Acadians out of 18,000 were forcefully deported to various locations around the world, though 8000 died before arrival. The remaining 6000 Acadians escaped the British by fleeing North to the present Acadia, or to Canada. From 1755 to 1757, most Acadians were deported to the Thirteen Colonies. From 1758 to 1762, most were sent to France. Between 1763 and 1785, many deported Acadians relocated to join their compatriots in Louisiana. Their descendants became Cajuns. In the 1780s and 1790s, some Acadians returned to Acadia, and discovered several thousand English immigrants, mostly from New England, on their former lands.

In the late 1700s, the British began to make efforts to colonise the region, mostly by importing colonists from New England. Before the American Revolution, these colonists were called planters. After the revolution, the colonists were called loyalists, because only those loyal to the British crown settled in Nova Scotia. In 1766, planters from Pennsylvania founded Moncton, and English settlers from Yorkshire arrived in the Sackville area. In the 1770s, 10,000 loyalists settled along the north shore of the Bay of Fundy. The number reached almost 14,000 by 1784, with about one in ten eventually returning to the United States.

Colony of New Brunswick (1784-1867)
 New Brunswick was founded in 1784 upon the partition of Nova Scotia into two areas which became the Provinces of Nova Scotia and New Brunswick. In the same year, New Brunswick formed its first elected assembly. In 1785, Saint John became Canada's first incorporated city. The population of the colony reached 26,000 in 1806 and 35,000 in 1812.

The 19th century saw an age of prosperity based on wood export and shipbuilding, which was bolstered by the Canadian–American Reciprocity Treaty of 1854 and demand from the American Civil War. St. Martins became the third most productive shipbuilding town in the Maritimes and produced over 500 vessels. In 1848, responsible home government was granted, and the 1850s saw the emergence of political parties largely organised along religious and ethnic lines. The first half of the 1800s saw large-scale immigration from Ireland and Scotland, with the population reaching 252,047 by 1861.

The notion of unifying the separate colonies of British North America was discussed increasingly in the 1860s. Many felt the American Civil War to be the result of weak central government and wished to avoid such violence and chaos. The 1864 Charlottetown Conference was intended to discuss a Maritime Union, but concerns over possible conquest by the Americans, coupled with a belief that Britain was unwilling to defend its colonies against an American attack, led to a request from the Province of Canada (now Ontario and Quebec) to expand the meeting's scope. In 1866 the United States cancelled the Reciprocity Treaty, leading to loss of trade with New England and prompting a desire to build trade within British North America, and Fenian raids increased support for union. On 1 July 1867, New Brunswick entered the Canadian Confederation along with Nova Scotia and the Province of Canada.

Canadian province (1867-present)

Confederation brought into existence the Intercolonial Railway in 1872, a consolidation of the existing Nova Scotia Railway, European and North American Railway, and Grand Trunk Railway. In 1879 John A. Macdonald's Conservatives enacted the National Policy which called for high tariffs and opposed free trade, disrupting the trading relationship between the Maritimes and New England. The economic situation was worsened by the decline of the wooden ship building industry. The railways and tariffs did foster the growth of new industries in the province such as textile manufacturing, iron mills, and sugar refineries, many of which eventually failed to compete with better capitalized industry in central Canada.

In 1937 New Brunswick had the highest infant mortality and illiteracy rates in Canada. At the end of the Great Depression the New Brunswick standard of living was much below the Canadian average. In 1940 the Rowell–Sirois Commission reported that the federal government attempts to manage the depression illustrated grave flaws in the Canadian constitution. While the federal government had most of the revenue gathering powers, the provinces had many expenditure responsibilities such as healthcare, education, and welfare, which were becoming increasingly expensive. The Commission recommended the creation of equalization payments, implemented in 1957.

After Canada joined World War II, 14 NB army units were organized, in addition to The Royal New Brunswick Regiment, and first deployed in the Italian campaign in 1943. After the Normandy landings they redeployed to northwestern Europe, along with The North Shore Regiment. The British Commonwealth Air Training Plan, a training program for ally pilots, established bases in Moncton, Chatham, and Pennfield Ridge, as well as a military typing school in Saint John. While relatively unindustrialized before the war, New Brunswick became home to 34 plants on military contracts from which the province received over $78 million. Prime Minister William Lyon Mackenzie King, who had promised no conscription, asked the provinces if they would release the government of said promise. New Brunswick voted 69.1% yes. The policy was not implemented until 1944, too late for many of the conscripts to be deployed. There were 1808 NB fatalities among the armed forces.

The Acadians in northern New Brunswick had long been geographically and linguistically isolated from the more numerous English speakers to the south. The population of French origin grew dramatically after Confederation, from about 16 per cent in 1871 to 34 per cent in 1931. Government services were often not available in French, and the infrastructure in Francophone areas was less developed than elsewhere. In 1960 Premier Louis Robichaud embarked on the New Brunswick Equal Opportunity program, in which education, rural road maintenance, and healthcare fell under the sole jurisdiction of a provincial government that insisted on equal coverage throughout the province, rather than the former county-based system. In 1969 the Robichaud government adopted the Official Languages Act making the province officially bilingual and establishing the right of New Brunswickers to obtain provincial government services in the official language of their choice. In 1982 at the request of the government of Richard Hatfield, this right became part of the Canadian Charter of Rights and Freedoms and therefore part of the Constitution of Canada.

The flag of New Brunswick, based on the coat of arms, was adopted in 1965. The conventional heraldic representations of a lion and a ship represent colonial ties with Europe, and the importance of shipping at the time the coat of arms was assigned.

Geography

Roughly square, New Brunswick is bordered on the north by Quebec, on the east by the Atlantic Ocean, on the south by the Bay of Fundy, and on the west by the US state of Maine. The southeast corner of the province is connected to Nova Scotia at the isthmus of Chignecto.

Glaciation has left much of New Brunswick's uplands with only shallow, acidic soils which have discouraged settlement but which are home to enormous forests.

Climate
New Brunswick's climate is more severe than that of the other Maritime provinces, which are lower and have more shoreline along the moderating sea. New Brunswick has a humid continental climate, with slightly milder winters on the Gulf of St. Lawrence coastline. Elevated parts of the far north of the province have a subarctic climate.

Evidence of climate change in New Brunswick can be seen in its more intense precipitation events, more frequent winter thaws, and one quarter to half the amount of snowpack. Today the sea level is about  higher than it was 100 years ago, and it is expected to rise twice that much again by the year 2100.

Flora and fauna

Most of New Brunswick is forested with secondary forest or tertiary forest. At the start of European settlement, the Maritimes were covered from coast to coast by a forest of mature trees, giants by today's standards. Today less than one per cent of old-growth Acadian forest remains, and the World Wide Fund for Nature lists the Acadian Forest as endangered. Following the frequent large scale disturbances caused by settlement and timber harvesting, the Acadian forest is not growing back as it was, but is subject to borealization. This means that exposure-resistant species that are well adapted to the frequent large-scale disturbances common in the boreal forest are increasingly abundant. These include jack pine, balsam fir, black spruce, white birch, and poplar. Forest ecosystems support large carnivores such as the bobcat, Canada lynx, and black bear, and the large herbivores moose and white-tailed deer.

Fiddlehead greens are harvested from the Ostrich fern which grows on riverbanks. Furbish's lousewort, a perennial herb endemic to the shores of the upper Saint John River, is an endangered species threatened by habitat destruction, riverside development, forestry, littering and recreational use of the riverbank. Many wetlands are being disrupted by the highly invasive Introduced species purple loosestrife.

The deer population in the province has dropped by 70% since 1985. The widespread use of glyphosate may have contributed to this.

Since 2014, the New Brunswick government has allowed forestry companies to harvest 20 percent more wood there than before.

Geology

Bedrock types range from 1 billion to 200 million years old.
Much of the bedrock in the west and north derives from ocean deposits in the Ordovician that were subject to folding and igneous intrusion and that were eventually covered with lava during the Paleozoic, peaking during the Acadian orogeny.

During the Carboniferous period, about 340 million years ago, New Brunswick was in the Maritimes Basin, a sedimentary basin near the equator. Sediments, brought by rivers from surrounding highlands, accumulated there; after being compressed, they produced the Albert oil shales of southern New Brunswick. Eventually, sea water from the Panthalassic Ocean invaded the basin, forming the Windsor Sea. Once this receded, conglomerates, sandstones, and shales accumulated. The rust colour of these was caused by the oxidation of iron in the beds between wet and dry periods. Such late Carboniferous rock formed the Hopewell Rocks, which have been shaped by the extreme tidal range of the Bay of Fundy.

In the early Triassic, as Pangea drifted north it was rent apart, forming the rift valley that is the Bay of Fundy. Magma pushed up through the cracks, forming basalt columns on Grand Manan.

Topography

New Brunswick lies entirely within the Appalachian Mountain range. The rivers of New Brunswick drain into either the Gulf of Saint Lawrence to the east or the Bay of Fundy to the south. These watersheds include lands in Quebec and Maine.

New Brunswick and the rest of the Maritime Peninsula was covered by thick layers of ice during the last glacial period (the Wisconsinian glaciation). It cut U-shaped valleys in the Saint John and Nepisiguit River valleys and pushed granite boulders from the Miramichi highlands south and east, leaving them as erratics when the ice receded at the end of the Wisconsin glaciation, along with deposits such as the eskers between Woodstock and St George, which are today sources of sand and gravel.

Demographics

The four Atlantic Provinces are Canada's least populated, with New Brunswick the third-least populous at 775,610 in 2021, up 3.8% since 2016. A more recent estimate is that the population surpassed 800,000 in March 2022.

The Atlantic provinces also have higher rural populations. New Brunswick was largely rural until 1951; since then, the rural-urban split has been roughly even. Population density in the Maritimes is above average among Canadian provinces, which reflects their small size and the fact that they do not possess large, unpopulated hinterlands, as do the other seven provinces and three territories.

The three major urban areas are in the south of the province and are Greater Moncton, population 157,717, Greater Saint John, population 130,613, and Greater Fredericton, population 108,610.

Ethnicity 
In the 2001 census, the most commonly reported ethnicities were British 40%, French Canadian and Acadian 31%, Irish 18%, other European 7%, First Nations 3%, Asian Canadian 2%. Each person could choose more than one ethnicity.

Language 

As of the 2021 Canadian Census, the most spoken languages in the province included English (698,025 or 91.94%), French (317,825 or 41.86%), Spanish (7,580 or 1%), Arabic (6,090 or 0.8%), Tagalog (4,225 or 0.56%), and Hindi (3,745 or 0.49%). The question on knowledge of languages allows for multiple responses.

According to the Canadian Constitution, both English and French are the official languages of New Brunswick, making it the only officially bilingual province. Government and public services are available in both English and French.
For education, English-language and French-language systems serve the two linguistic communities at all levels. Anglophone New Brunswickers make up roughly two-thirds of the population, while about one-third are Francophone. Recently there has been growth in the numbers of people reporting themselves as bilingual, with 34% reporting that they speak both English and French. This reflects a trend across Canada.

Religion 
According to the 2021 census, religious groups in New Brunswick included:
Christianity (512,645 persons or 67.5%)
Irreligion (225,125 persons or 29.7%)
Islam (9,190 persons or 1.2%)
Hinduism (3,340 persons or 0.4%)
Sikhism (1,780 persons or 0.2%)
Buddhism (1,120 persons or 0.1%)
Indigenous Spirituality (1,005 persons or 0.1%)
Judaism (1,000 persons or 0.1%)
Other (3,990 persons or 0.5%)

In the 2011 census, 84% of provincial residents reported themselves as Christian: 52% were Roman Catholic, 8% Baptist, 8% United Church of Canada, 7% Anglican and 9% other Christian. 15% percent of residents reported no religion.

Economy

As of October 2017, seasonally adjusted employment is 73,400 for the goods-producing sector and 280,900 for the services-producing sector. Those in the goods-producing industries are mostly employed in manufacturing or construction, while those in services work in social assistance, trades, and health care. A large portion of the economy is controlled by the Irving Group of Companies, which consists of the holdings of the family of K. C. Irving. The companies have significant holdings in agriculture, forestry, food processing, freight transport (including railways and trucking), media, oil, and shipbuilding.

The United States is the province's largest export market, accounting for 92% of a foreign trade valued in 2014 at almost $13 billion, with refined petroleum making up 63% of that, followed by seafood products, pulp, paper and sawmill products and non-metallic minerals (chiefly potash). The value of exports, mostly to the United States, was $1.6 billion in 2016. About half of that came from lobster. Other products include salmon, crab, and herring. In 2015, spending on non-resident tourism in New Brunswick was $441 million, which provided $87 million in tax revenue.

The influence of the Irving family (owners of Canada's largest refinery, vast farms and forest estates, newspapers, numerous sawmills and paper mills, a fleet of boats and trucks, or a rail network) on New Brunswick is such that the province is sometimes described as being subject to a form of economic feudalism. In 2016, the 200 or so companies it controls gave it about $10 billion in capital.

The group's activities are supported by the authorities through numerous tax exemptions and the payment of subsidies, notably through the Renewable Energy Purchase Program for Large Industry. The province has also progressively handed over the management of the public sector forestry assets to the Irving Group, regularly lowering standards. In 2014, the latter reduced the size of buffer zones between forests and human settlements, allowed more clear-cutting, increased the planned production volume and reduced the proportion of protected areas from 31% to 22%.

The family owns all of the province's English-language newspapers. It also owns several local radio and television stations. For academic Alain Deneault, "the conflicts of interest that arise from this situation seem caricatural: the group's media essentially echo the positions of the Irving family in all the fields of social and industrial life in which it is involved." The information transmitted by the group and disseminated by the press is sometimes questioned (notably in the fall of 2018, during an explosion at the Saint John refinery), but few public officials, professors and members of parliament carry denunciations, as the family's financial contributions to universities and political parties provide it with leverage.

Biologists, academics and Eilish Cleary, the province's former head of public health, have reported being subjected to intense pressure (including dismissal in Cleary's case) while analyzing the impact of the company's pesticides and its opaque forest management. Since the 1970s, every premier in the province has been elected with the support of Irving. Blaine Higgs, premier since November 2018, is a former executive of the group. According to journalist Michel Cormier: "We might be able to win an election without Irving's tacit support, but we could hardly aspire to power if he decided to openly oppose it."

Primary sector
A large number of residents from New Brunswick are employed in the primary sector of industry. More than 13,000 New Brunswickers work in agriculture, shipping products worth over $1 billion, half of which is from crops, and half of that from potatoes, mostly in the Saint John River valley. McCain Foods is one of the world's largest manufacturers of frozen potato products. Other products include apples, cranberries, and maple syrup. New Brunswick was in 2015 the biggest producer of wild blueberries in Canada. The value of the livestock sector is about a quarter of a billion dollars, nearly half of which is dairy. Other sectors include poultry, fur, and goats, sheep, and pigs.

About 85 to 90% of New Brunswick is forested. Historically important, it accounted for more than 80% of exports in the mid-1800s. By the end of the 1800s the industry, and shipbuilding, were declining due to external economic factors. The 1920s saw the development of a pulp and paper industry. In the mid-1960s, forestry practices changed from the controlled harvests of a commodity to the cultivation of the forests. The industry employs nearly 12,000, generating revenues around $437 million.

Mining was historically unimportant in the province, but has grown since the 1950s. The province's GDP from the Mining and Quarrying industry in 2015 was $299.5 million. Mines in New Brunswick produce lead, zinc, copper, and potash.

Forest management in the province is particularly opaque. Donald Bowser, an international expert on political corruption, says he is "shocked to discover that there is less transparency in New Brunswick than in Kurdistan, Guatemala or Sierra Leone, despite the huge public funds committed to natural resource development.

Education

Public education elementary and secondary education in the province is administered by the provincial Department of Education and Early Childhood Development. New Brunswick has a parallel system of Anglophone and Francophone public schools. In the anglophone system, approximately 27 per cent of the students are enrolled in a French immersion programs.

The province also operates five public post-secondary institutions, including four public universities and one college. Four public universities operate campuses in New Brunswick, including the oldest English-language university in the country, the University of New Brunswick. Other English-language public universities include Mount Allison University and St. Thomas University. Université de Moncton is the province's only French-language university. All four universities offer undergraduate, and postgraduate education. Additionally, the Université de Moncton and the University of New Brunswick also provide professional programs.

Public colleges in the province are managed as a part of the New Brunswick Community College (NBCC) system, except for the New Brunswick College of Craft & Design, which has operated through the Department of Post-Secondary Education, Training and Labour since 1938. In addition to public institutions, the province is also home to several private vocational schools, such as the Moncton Flight College; and universities, the largest being Crandall University.

Government

Under Canadian federalism, power is divided between federal and provincial governments. Among areas under federal jurisdiction are citizenship, foreign affairs, national defence, fisheries, criminal law, Indigenous policies, and many others. Provincial jurisdiction covers public lands, health, education, and local government, among other things. Jurisdiction is shared for immigration, pensions, agriculture, and welfare.

The parliamentary system of government is modelled on the British Westminster system. Forty-nine representatives, nearly always members of political parties, are elected to the Legislative Assembly of New Brunswick. The head of government is the Premier of New Brunswick, normally the leader of the party or coalition with the most seats in the legislative assembly. Governance is handled by the executive council (cabinet), with about 32 ministries. Ceremonial duties of the Monarchy in New Brunswick are mostly carried out by the Lieutenant Governor of New Brunswick.

Under amendments to the province's Legislative Assembly Act in 2007, a provincial election is held every four years. The two largest political parties are the New Brunswick Liberal Association and the Progressive Conservative Party of New Brunswick. Since the 2018 election, minor parties are the Green Party of New Brunswick and the People's Alliance of New Brunswick.

Judiciary
The Court of Appeal of New Brunswick is the highest provincial court. It hears appeals from:
 The Court of King's Bench of New Brunswick: has jurisdiction over family law and major criminal and civil cases and is divided accordingly into two divisions: Family and Trial. It also hears administrative tribunals.
 The Probate Court of New Brunswick: has jurisdiction over estates of deceased persons.
 The Provincial Court of New Brunswick: nearly all cases involving the criminal code start here.

The system consists of eight Judicial Districts, loosely based on the counties. The Chief Justice of New Brunswick serves at the apex of this court structure.

Administrative divisions

Historically the province was divided into counties with elected governance, but this was abolished in 1966. While county governments have been abolished in New Brunswick, counties continue to be used as census divisions by Statistics Canada, and as an organizational unit, along with parishes, for registration of real-estate and its taxation. Counties continue to figure into the sense of identity of many New Brunwickers. Counties are further subdivided into 152 parishes, which also lost their political significance in 1966 but are still used as census subdivisions by Statistics Canada.

Ninety-two per cent of the land in the province, inhabited by about 35% of the population, is under provincial administration and has no local, elected representation. The 51% of the province that is Crown land is administered by the Department of Natural Resources and Energy Development.

Most of the province is administrated as a local service district (LSD), an unincorporated unit of local governance. As of 2017, there are 237 LSDs. Services, paid for by property taxes, include a variety of services such as fire protection, solid waste management, street lighting, and dog regulation. LSDs may elect advisory committees and work with the Department of Local Government to recommend how to spend locally collected taxes.

In 2006 there were three rural communities. This is a relatively new type of entity; to be created, it requires a population of 3,000 and a tax base of $200 million. In 2006 there were 101 municipalities.

Regional Service Commissions, which number 12, were introduced in 2013 to regulate regional planning and solid waste disposal, and provide a forum for discussion on a regional level of police and emergency services, climate change adaptation planning, and regional sport, recreational and cultural facilities. The commissions' administrative councils are populated by the mayors of each municipality or rural community within a region.

Provincial finances
In 2015, New Brunswick had the most poorly-performing economy of any Canadian province, with a per capita income of $28,000. The government has historically run at a large deficit. With about half of the population being rural, it is expensive for the government to provide education and health services, which account for 60 per cent of government expenditure. Thirty-six per cent of the provincial budget is covered by federal cash transfers.

The government has frequently attempted to create employment through subsidies, which has often failed to generate long-term economic prosperity and has resulted in bad debt, examples of which include Bricklin, Atcon, and the Marriott call centre in Fredericton.

According to a 2014 study by the Atlantic Institute for Market Studies, the large public debt is a very serious problem. Government revenues are shrinking because of a decline in federal transfer payments. Though expenditures are down (through government pension reform and a reduction in the number of public employees), they have increased relative to GDP, necessitating further measures to reduce debt in the future.

In the 2014–15 fiscal year, provincial debt reached $12.2 billion or 37.7 per cent of nominal GDP, an increase over the $10.1 billion recorded in 2011–12. The debt-to-GDP ratio is projected to fall to 36.7% in 2019–20.

Infrastructure

Energy

Publicly owned NB Power operates 13 of New Brunswick's generating stations, deriving power from fuel oil and diesel (1497 MW), hydro (889 MW), nuclear (660 MW), and coal (467 MW). There were 30 active natural gas production sites in 2012.

Health care
New Brunswickers are entitled to the universal and government-funded healthcare operated by the Department of Health. They can use their Medicare card to get this care or receive care in another province. New Brunswick is divided into 2 health care regions: Vitalité Health Network and Horizon Health Network. There also exists 2 confidential health information lines: 911 (for emergencies) and 811 (for non-urgent health questions). 

Finding a family doctor is important for all New Brunswickers, but it has become difficult over the last decade. Patient Connect NB is a provincially managed, bilingual patient registry that matches New Brunswickers with a family doctor or nurse practitioner on a first-come, first-serve basis. As of 2022, this registry lists at 74,000 people waiting to be matched.

Health care services not covered by the government include: dentists, optometrists, retirement homes, mental health services, private clinics, and health insurance.

Transportation

The Department of Transportation and Infrastructure maintains government facilities and the province's highway network and ferries. The Trans-Canada Highway is not under federal jurisdiction, and traverses the province from Edmundston following the Saint John River Valley, through Fredericton, Moncton, and on to Nova Scotia and Prince Edward Island.

Rail 

Via Rail's Ocean service, which connects Montreal to Halifax, is currently the oldest continuously operated passenger route in North America, with stops from west to east at Campbellton, Charlo, Jacquet River, Petit Rocher, Bathurst, Miramichi, Rogersville, Moncton, and Sackville.

Canadian National Railway operates freight services along the same route, as well as a subdivision from Moncton to Saint John. The New Brunswick Southern Railway, a division of J. D. Irving Limited, together with its sister company Eastern Maine Railway form a continuous  main line connecting Saint John and Brownville Junction, Maine.

Culture

Historic places and museums
There are about 61 historic places in New Brunswick, including Fort Beauséjour, Kings Landing Historical Settlement and the Village Historique Acadien. Established in 1842, the New Brunswick Museum in Saint John was designated as the provincial museum of New Brunswick. The province is also home to a number of other museums in addition to the provincial museum.

Music and theatre

The music of New Brunswick includes artists such as Henry Burr, Roch Voisine, Lenny Breau, and Édith Butler. Symphony New Brunswick, based in Saint John, tours extensively in the province. Symphony New Brunswick and the Atlantic Ballet Theatre of Canada tours nationally and internationally.

Theatre New Brunswick tours plays around the province. Canadian playwright Norm Foster saw his early works premiere with Theatre New Brunswick. Other theatres of the province include the Théatre populaire d'Acadie in Caraquet, the Live Bait Theatre in Sackville, the Imperial in Saint John, the Capitol theatre in Moncton, and the Playhouse theatre in Fredericton.

Visual arts
New Brunswick is home to many galleries across the province, including the Beaverbrook Art Gallery, which was designated as New Brunswick's provincial art gallery in 1994, and the Galerie d’art Louise-et-Reuben-Cohen at the Université de Moncton. New Brunswick also has four artist-run-centres: Connexion ARC located in Fredericton, Galerie Sans Nom Moncton, Struts Gallery in Sackville and Third Space Gallery in Saint John, as well as one artist-run printshop, Atelier d'estampe Imago Inc., located in Moncton.

Mount Allison University is known for its art program, which was created in 1854. The program came into its own under John A. Hammond, from 1893 to 1916. Alex Colville and Lawren Harris later studied and taught art there, and both Christopher Pratt and Mary Pratt were trained at Mount Allison's fine arts school. The university also opened an art gallery in 1895 and is named for its patron, John Owens of Saint John. The Owens Art Gallery at Mount Allison University is presently the oldest university-operated art gallery in Canada.

Modern New Brunswick artists include landscape painter Jack Humphrey, sculptor Claude Roussel, and Miller Brittain.

Literature
Julia Catherine Beckwith, born in Fredericton, was Canada's first published novelist. Poet Bliss Carman and his cousin Charles G. D. Roberts were some of the first Canadians to achieve international fame for letters. Antonine Maillet was the first non-European winner of France's Prix Goncourt. Other modern writers include Alfred Bailey, Alden Nowlan, John Thompson, Douglas Lochhead, K. V. Johansen, David Adams Richards, and France Daigle. A recent New Brunswick Lieutenant-Governor, Herménégilde Chiasson, is a poet and playwright. The Fiddlehead, established in 1945 at University of New Brunswick, is Canada's oldest literary magazine.

Media
New Brunswick has four daily newspapers: the Times & Transcript, serving eastern New Brunswick; the Telegraph-Journal, based in Saint John and distributed province-wide; The Daily Gleaner, based in Fredericton; and L'Acadie Nouvelle, based in Caraquet. The three English-language dailies and the majority of the weeklies are owned and operated by Brunswick News—which is privately owned by James K. Irving. Due to its dominant position, critics have accused Brunswick News of being biased towards the Irving Group of Companies, noting its reluctance to publish stories that are critical of the group.

The Canadian Broadcasting Corporation has anglophone television and radio operations in Fredericton. Télévision de Radio-Canada is based in Moncton. CTV and Global also operate stations in New Brunswick, which operate largely as sub-feeds of their stations in Halifax as part of regional networks.

There are 34 radio stations licensed in New Brunswick, broadcasting in English or French.

See also

Outline of New Brunswick
Symbols of New Brunswick

References

External links

Official site of Tourism New Brunswick

 
1867 establishments in Canada
Former British colonies and protectorates in the Americas
Provinces and territories of Canada
States and territories established in 1867
The Maritimes
Atlantic Canada
1784 establishments in the British Empire
French-speaking countries and territories
English-speaking countries and territories